Nicolae Bosie-Codreanu (21 December 1885 – 1969) was a Bessarabian politician who voted for the Union of Bessarabia with Romania on 27 March 1918.

Biography 
He served as Member of the Moldovan Parliament (1917–1918). After , he served in Pantelimon Erhan Cabinet as Director General for Railroads.

In the interwar period he worked as an engineer, director in the Ministry of Construction in Bucharest.

Gallery

Bibliography 
 Pantelimon Halippa – tribun al Basrabiei/Ion Constantin, Ion Negrei. – București: Biblioteca Bucureștilor, 2009. 
Gheorghe E. Cojocaru, Sfatul Țării: itinerar, Civitas, Chişinău, 1998, 
Mihai Taşcă, Sfatul Țării şi actualele autorităţi locale, "Timpul de dimineaţă", no. 114 (849), 27 June 2008 (page 16)

External links 
 Arhiva pentru Sfatul Tarii
 Deputaţii Sfatului Ţării şi Lavrenti Beria

Notes

1885 births
1969 deaths
Moldovan MPs 1917–1918
Transport ministers of Moldova
People from Chernivtsi Oblast